Moses Josiah Moody (born May 31, 2002) is an American professional basketball player for the Golden State Warriors of the National Basketball Association (NBA). He played college basketball for the Arkansas Razorbacks.

Moody was drafted 14th overall in the 2021 NBA draft by the Warriors. During his rookie season with the team, he won an NBA championship.

High school career
Moody began playing high school basketball for Parkview Arts and Science Magnet High School in Little Rock, Arkansas, where he helped his team reach the state championship game in his freshman season. As a sophomore, he moved to North Little Rock High School in North Little Rock, Arkansas. Moody averaged 18.6 points, 7.2 rebounds, 3.1 assists, 2.1 steals and 1.4 blocks per game, leading his team to the Class 7A state title. He was named to the Arkansas Democrat-Gazette All-Underclassman Team and the Arkansas 7A All-State Team. For his junior year, Moody transferred to Montverde Academy in Montverde, Florida. He averaged 17.7 points, 3.9 rebounds, 1.5 assists and 1.6 steals per game for Bradley Beal Elite at the Nike Elite Youth Basketball League (EYBL) regular season and was named to the All-EYBL honorable mention. In his senior season, Moody averaged 11.6 points, 3.3 rebounds, and 1.8 assists per game for Montverde, the consensus number one team in the nation, who he helped achieve a 25–0 regular season record.

Recruiting
Moody received several high major NCAA Division I scholarship offers as early as his sophomore season. He finished high school as a consensus four-star recruit in the 2020 class. On November 9, 2019, Moody committed to play college basketball for Arkansas over offers from Michigan and Virginia, among others. He became the highest ranked player to commit to Arkansas since Bobby Portis of the 2013 class.

College career
Moody recorded a career-high 28 points four times in the 2020-2021 season for the Razorbacks. As a freshman, he averaged 16.8 points and 5.8 rebounds per game. Moody earned SEC Freshman of the Year and First Team All-SEC honors. After helping Arkansas to a 25-7 overall record, an Elite Eight appearance in the 2021 NCAA Tournament, and a Top Ten finish in the polls, he declared for the 2021 NBA draft on April 9, 2021, forgoing his remaining college eligibility.

Professional career

Golden State Warriors (2021–present)

Moody was selected with the 14th pick in the 2021 NBA draft by the Golden State Warriors. On August 5, 2021, Moody signed with the Golden State Warriors . On October 19, 2021, Moody made his debut in the NBA, coming off the bench with two points and two rebounds in a 121–114 win over the Los Angeles Lakers. On January 11, 2022, on assignment with the Santa Cruz Warriors of the NBA G League, Moody scored 37 points in a 132-130 overtime victory over the Memphis Hustle. On March 7, 2022, Moody scored a career-high 30 points in a 131–124 loss to the Denver Nuggets. On June 16, 2022, Moody won the 2022 NBA Finals with the Warriors.

Career statistics

NBA

Regular season

|-
| style="text-align:left;background:#afe6ba;"|†
| style="text-align:left;"| Golden State
| 52 || 11 || 11.7 || .437 || .364 || .778 || 1.5 || .4 || .1 || .2 || 4.4
|- class="sortbottom"
| style="text-align:center;" colspan="2"| Career
| 52 || 11 || 11.7 || .437 || .364 || .778 || 1.5 || .4 || .1 || .2 || 4.4

Playoffs

|-
| style="text-align:left;background:#afe6ba;"|2022†
| style="text-align:left;"| Golden State
| 13 || 0 || 8.1 || .536 || .538 || .667 || .6 || .3 || .2 || .2 || 3.2
|- class="sortbottom"
| style="text-align:center;" colspan="2"| Career
| 13 || 0 || 8.1 || .536 || .538 || .667 || .6 || .3 || .2 || .2 || 3.2

College

|-
| style="text-align:left;"| 2020–21
| style="text-align:left;"| Arkansas
| 32 || 32 || 33.8 || .427 || .358 || .812 || 5.8 || 1.6 || 1.0 || .7 || 16.8

References

External links
Arkansas Razorbacks bio
USA Basketball bio

2002 births
Living people
American men's basketball players
Arkansas Razorbacks men's basketball players
Basketball players from Arkansas
Golden State Warriors draft picks
Golden State Warriors players
Montverde Academy alumni
Santa Cruz Warriors players
Shooting guards
Sportspeople from Little Rock, Arkansas